Epimenides of Cnossos (or  Epimenides of Crete) was a semi-mythical 7th or 6th century BC Greek seer and philosopher-poet, from Knossos or Phaistos.

Life
While tending his father's sheep, Epimenides is said to have fallen asleep for fifty-seven years in a Cretan cave sacred to Zeus, after which he reportedly awoke with the gift of prophecy (Diogenes Laërtius i. 109–115). Plutarch writes that Epimenides purified Athens after the pollution brought by the Alcmeonidae, and that the seer's expertise in sacrifices and reform of funeral practices were of great help to Solon in his reform of the Athenian state. The only reward he would accept was a branch of the sacred olive, and a promise of perpetual friendship between Athens and Cnossus (Plutarch, Life of Solon, 12; Aristotle, Ath. Pol. 1).

Athenaeus also mentions him, in connection with the self-sacrifice of the erastes and eromenos pair of Cratinus and Aristodemus, who were believed to have given their lives in order to purify Athens. Even in antiquity there were those who held the story to be mere fiction (The Deipnosophists, XIII. 78–79). Diogenes Laërtius preserves a number of spurious letters between Epimenides and Solon in his Lives of the Philosophers. Epimenides was also said to have prophesied at Sparta on military matters.

He died in Crete at an advanced age; according to his countrymen, who afterwards honoured him as a god, he lived nearly three hundred years. According to another story, he was taken prisoner in a war between the Spartans and Cnossians, and put to death by his captors, because he refused to prophesy favourably for them. Pausanias reports that when Epimenides died, his skin was found to be covered with tattooed writing. This was considered odd, because the Greeks reserved tattooing for slaves. Some modern scholars have seen this as evidence that Epimenides was heir to the shamanic religions of Central Asia, because tattooing is often associated with shamanic initiation. The skin of Epimenides was preserved at the courts of the ephores in Sparta, conceivably as a good-luck charm. Epimenides is also reckoned with Melampus and Onomacritus as one of the founders of Orphism.

According to Diogenes Laërtius, Epimenides met Pythagoras in Crete, and they went to the Cave of Ida.

Works

Several prose and poetic works, now lost, were attributed to Epimenides, including a theogony, an epic poem on the Argonautic expedition, prose works on purifications and sacrifices, a cosmogony, oracles, a work on the laws of Crete, and a treatise on Minos and Rhadymanthus.

Cretica
Epimenides' Cretica (Κρητικά) is quoted twice in the New Testament. Its only source is a 9th-century Syriac commentary by Isho'dad of Merv on the Acts of the Apostles, discovered, edited and translated (into Greek) by Prof. J. Rendel Harris in a series of articles.

In the poem, Minos addresses Zeus thus:

The "lie" of the Cretans is that Zeus was mortal; Epimenides considered Zeus immortal. "Cretans, always liars," with the same theological intent as Epimenides, also appears in the Hymn to Zeus of Callimachus. The fourth line is quoted (with a reference to one of "your own poets")  in Acts of the Apostles, chapter 17, verse 28.

The second line is quoted, with a veiled attribution ("a prophet of their own"), in the Epistle to Titus, chapter 1, verse 12, to warn Titus about the Cretans. The "prophet" in Titus 1:12 is identified by Clement of Alexandria as "Epimenides" (Stromata, i. 14). In this passage, Clement mentions that "some say" Epimenides should be counted among the seven wisest philosophers.

Chrysostom (Homily 3 on Titus) gives an alternative fragment:
For even a tomb, King, of you
They made, who never died, but ever shall be.

Epimenides paradox
It is not clear when Epimenides became associated with the Epimenides paradox, a variation of the liar paradox. Epimenides himself does not appear to have intended any irony or paradox in his statement "Cretans, always liars." In the epistle to Titus, there is a warning that "One of themselves, even a prophet of their own, said, the Cretians are always liars, evil beasts, slow bellies." In the Middle Ages, many forms of the liar paradox were studied under the heading of insolubilia, but these were not associated with Epimenides.

See also

 Non-canonical books referenced in the Bible

Notes

References

Further reading

 Zaykov, Andrey. Epimemdes' activities in Sparta (In Russian + English summary). In: Journal of Ancient History. Moscow, 2002. No 4. P. 110-130.

Epimenides of Crete Fragments at demonax.info

6th-century BC poets
6th-century BC philosophers
Ancient Greek poets
Archaic Greek seers
Ancient Greek shamans
Classical oracles
Immigrants to Archaic Athens
Longevity myths
Luck
Seven Sages of Greece
Year of birth unknown
Year of death unknown
Rip Van Winkle-type stories
Ancient Knossians
Ancient Phaistians
Ancient Cretan poets